Sentinel is a giant sequoia located within the Giant Forest Grove of Sequoia National Park, California. It is the 43rd largest giant sequoia in the world, and could be considered either the 42nd or 41st largest depending on how badly Ishi Giant and Black Mountain Beauty have atrophied following devastating wildfires in 2015 and 2017, respectively.

Description
The tree stands directly in front of the Giant Forest Museum, from which one can get close to the base of the tree. It features a lush canopy and two prominent burn scars at the base of the trunk.

Dimensions
The dimensions of Sentinel as measured by Flint and Law are shown below. The calculated volume ignores burns.

See also
List of largest giant sequoias
List of individual trees

References

External links
 Sentinel tree at famousredwoods.com

Individual giant sequoia trees
Natural history of Tulare County, California